Comedy Cuts is a comedy programme on the British TV channel ITV2 that aims to provide an opportunity for new comedy performers to present their talents. Featuring 40 performers demonstrating a mix of stand up and sketches, the series is shot entirely on location. Each act is taken out into the world and situated somewhere which echoes their individual style.

Series 3 went into production in 2008 but has yet to be broadcast

Performers
Tim Minchin
Katy Brand
Ed Byrne
Tony Law
Mark Watson
Glenn Wool
Howard Read
Gary Le Strange
Brendon Burns
Steve Hughes
Simon Munnery
Robin Ince
Lucy Porter
Matt Kirshen
Phil Nicol
Andrew Lawrence
Jim Jeffries
Rhod Gilbert
Nick Doody
Count Arthur Strong

References

External links

2007 British television series debuts
2000s British comedy television series
ITV comedy